Manolo Lama (born 3 January 1962 in Madrid, Spain) is a Spanish radio sportscaster. Manolo Lama is known for his play-by-play covers of Real Madrid, Atlético Madrid and Spain matches at the radio program Tiempo de Juego in the Cadena COPE from 1982 until 2011 in the Cadena Ser.

Manolo Lama has also covered a lot of important events such as the Olympic Games or FIFA World Cup games. In the Cadena COPE he also presents a program called Deportes COPE and collaborates in the program called El Partidazo de COPE. In television he presents the afternoon sports bulletin in Cuatro (TV).

Lama is also the Spanish play-by-play announcer (alongside Paco González) of the EA Sports' FIFA series video game since 1998.

References

1962 births
Living people
Spanish reporters and correspondents